Bojná is a municipality in the Topoľčany District of the Nitra Region, Slovakia. The village has a population of 2013 people. The main landmark is Catholic Church of All Saints built in 1787. Opposite the church stands (since World War II defunct) synagogue, later turned community center then car repair and nowadays a bar.
The village stretches about 4 km along river Bojnianka which continues through villages of Veľké Dvorany, Urmince and Chrabrany before emptying into the Nitra river, itself a tributary of the Danube.

Etymology
The name is derived from boj (fight, battle) preserved in all Slavic languages. Bojna or Bojnica meant place of battle, battleground (modern Slovak: bojisko) but the name could be derived also from some personal name related to boj, e.g. Bojan, Bojen. In this case, Bojná is shortening of Bojnja Ves - village of Bojen. Similar names in Slovakia are Bojnice, Bojničky, Bojanová, Bojarky and many others.

Archeological complex
Bojná is known for an archeological complex which belongs to one of largest Great Moravian agglomeration in Slovakia. The system of Slavic hill forts lies on the southeast foot of Považský Inovec on the strategic point between Váh and Nitra river basins. The pass near Bojná was guarded by hill forts Bojná I (Valy), Bojná II (Hradisko), Bojná III (Žihľavník) and the location Bojná IV (Nové Valy). The locality is close to other pre-Great Moravian and Great Moravian sites like Pobedim, Ducové or Nitrianska Blatnica.

The hill fort Bojná I was protected by multiple walls as high as 6 meters with ditches and gates. In the 9th century, the hill fort was intensely populated. Several craft workshops (mostly smithies) and thousands of artifacts were unearthed on the place. Along with artisanal and agricultural tools, a large amount of weapons including typical battle axes, large knives, fragments of swords and seaxes. The presence of elite warriors can be documented by spurs, chain armors, gold-plated parts of military equipment, gold-coated and silver-coated adornments and other luxury objects. The religious articles belong to the oldest Christian articles in Slovakia. The most important findings are a bronze bell of Canino type, fragments of other three bells and six gold-coated plaquettes with angels and Christ dated to 780-820, dozen years before the mission of Saints Cyril and Methodius. Two short inscriptions in Latin alphabet are the oldest evidence of writing in the Slovak history.

A large amount of weapon can be related to the violent destruction of the hill fort, probably by the old Hungarian units. According to radiocarbon data and other dating methods, the hill fort could be used less intense in the 10th century, later settlement is not documented. The artifacts are displayed in Ponitrianske múzeum of Nitra. A local museum has opened in August 2007. Valy locality is currently being researched by an international archaeologist team.

Later history
The village itself was first mentioned in 1424, though an incorporated settlement Malé Dvorany was first mentioned in the end of the 12th century. Before the world wars there was also a sizeable Jewish population here.  The synagogue, once the approximate size of the remaining church, has been turned into a bar and a sports hall.

Present
Football is a popular sport and the village hosts two male adult teams (Slovan Bojná and Malé Dvorany) plus several junior teams.

Many of the locals and also outsiders have additional property used for recreation and gardening at the location called Vinohrad (vineyard) plus there are more cottages in the neighbouring forest. The forest itself is also used for mushroom picking by the villagers.

A private mini-zoo and a ranch has been opened at the forest line near the upper end of the village.

As of 2018, the eastern gate was reconstructed at the hillfort Bojná - Valy. It is 11 m high, 12 m wide and it has 7 m long tunnel behind the gate.

See also
 List of municipalities and towns in Slovakia

References

Sources

Genealogical resources

The records for genealogical research are available at the state archive "Statny Archiv in Nitra, Slovakia"
 Roman Catholic church records (births/marriages/deaths): 1721-1895 (parish A)
 Lutheran church records (births/marriages/deaths): 1708-1895 (parish B)

External links
Official homepage 
http://en.e-obce.sk/obec/bojna/bojna.html
Local elementary school website (outdated link)
Surnames of living people in Bojna

Villages and municipalities in Topoľčany District
Great Moravia